The domestic chicken breeds native to the Philippine islands include:

References